Bancheng may refer to the following locations in China:

 Bancheng, Guangxi (板城镇), town in Qinbei District, Qinzhou
 Bancheng, Hebei (板城镇), town in Kuancheng Manchu Autonomous County
 Bancheng, Jiangsu (半城镇), town in Sihong County